Frank Mazzilli (born December 7, 1962) is a former politician in Ontario, Canada. He was a Progressive Conservative member of the Legislative Assembly of Ontario from 1999 to 2003.

Background
Mazzilli has a diploma from the Ontario Police College, and worked as a member of the police force in London, Ontario from 1982 to 1999.

Politics
In the federal election of 1997 he ran as a Progressive Conservative candidate in the riding of London West, but lost to Liberal Sue Barnes by almost 14,000 votes.

He was elected to the Ontario legislature for the riding of London—Fanshawe in the provincial election of 1999, defeating Liberal Peter Mancini and New Democrat Irene Mathyssen in a close three-way race. In 2002, he served as a co-chair of the Ontario Crime Control Commission.

The Progressive Conservatives had lost much of their urban support by the time of the 2003 provincial election, and Mazzilli dropped to a third-place finish in London—Fanshawe against Mathyssen and the winner, Liberal Khalil Ramal.

His younger brother John Mazzilli ran unsuccessfully for the Conservative Party of Canada in both the 2004 and 2006 federal elections. Frank worked both times as his campaign co-chairman.

References

External links
 

1962 births
Italian emigrants to Canada
Living people
Politicians from London, Ontario
Progressive Conservative Party of Ontario MPPs
Progressive Conservative Party of Canada candidates for the Canadian House of Commons
Candidates in the 1997 Canadian federal election
21st-century Canadian politicians